Joseph John Schipp  (21 March 1932 – 23 November 2017) was an Australian politician in the New South Wales Government. He was the Liberal member for Wagga Wagga in the New South Wales Legislative Assembly from 1975 to 1999.

Personal life
Schipp was born in Mudgee and named for his father, Joseph William. He attended school at Mudgee, Temora and finally Wagga Wagga before qualifying as a primary school teacher in 1950. 
He married Rhonda Daisy Lange on 13 November 1954; they had two sons.

Career
In 1973 he joined the Liberal Party, becoming honorary secretary and vice-president of the local branch.

In 1975, the Liberal member for the local state seat of Wagga Wagga, Wal Fife, resigned to contest the corresponding federal seat of Farrer, and Schipp was preselected as the Liberal candidate for the by-election. He was elected easily on Country Party preferences. He was never significantly troubled in his own electorate. In 1988, on the election of the Greiner Coalition Government, he was appointed Minister for Housing. He was moved to Sport, Recreation and Racing in 1992, but was sacked in 1993 by Premier John Fahey.

Schipp retired in 1999. He died on 23 November 2017 at Gumly Gumly, New South Wales, aged 85.

References

 

1932 births
2017 deaths
Liberal Party of Australia members of the Parliament of New South Wales
Members of the New South Wales Legislative Assembly
Recipients of the Medal of the Order of Australia
People from Wagga Wagga